Route 102 is a  numbered state highway in the U.S. state of Rhode Island. Route 102 serves as a non-freeway beltway around the Providence metro area. It begins in the village of Wickford and travels through less developed areas of western Rhode Island. The route ends in the village of Slatersville.

Route 102 is one of the longer Rhode Island state highways, and is longer than the portion of Interstate 95 that runs through the state (43.5 miles).

Route description

Route 102 begins as Philips Street at Route 1A in the Wickford section of the town of North Kingstown on Narragansett Bay. It proceeds west through the town of Exeter along Ten Rod Road. Route 102 then turns northwest to follow Victory Highway as it goes through the towns of West Greenwich and Coventry. Route 102 soon enters the town of Foster, where it continues north and briefly overlaps with Route 14 (Plainfield Pike) through the town of Scituate. In Scituate, it continues north along Chopmist Hill Road, crossing US 6 as it heads towards the town of Glocester. After crossing US 44 in the Glocester village of Chepachet, Route 102 continues northeast into the town of Burrillville along the Bronco Highway. The route ends in the town of North Smithfield in the village of Slatersville at an intersection with Routes 5 and 146A.

History
Route 102 is an original Rhode Island route designation assigned in 1923. The original route extended beyond North Smithfield into the city of Woonsocket along Victory Highway and Great Road (modern Route 146A), then along South Main Street and Main Street to end at Route 122. The route was truncated to Route 146 (now Route 146A) by 1938.

Major intersections

References

External links

2019 Highway Map, Rhode Island

102
Transportation in Washington County, Rhode Island
Transportation in Kent County, Rhode Island
Transportation in Providence County, Rhode Island
North Kingstown, Rhode Island
Coventry, Rhode Island
Exeter, Rhode Island
North Smithfield, Rhode Island
Scituate, Rhode Island
West Greenwich, Rhode Island
Glocester, Rhode Island
Burrillville, Rhode Island